Salten og Lofoten District Court is a district court located in Nordland county, Norway. This court is based at two different courthouses which are located in Bodø and Svolvær. The court serves the Salten and Lofoten areas in the county which includes cases from 16 municipalities. The court in Bodø accepts cases from the municipalities of Beiarn, Bodø, Fauske, Gildeskål, Hamarøy, Meløy, Rødøy, Saltdal, Steigen, and Sørfold. The court in Svolvær accepts cases from the municipalities of Vågan, Vestvågøy, Flakstad, Moskenes, Værøy, and Røst. The court is subordinate to the Hålogaland Court of Appeal.

The court is led by a chief judge and several other judges. The court is a court of first instance. Its judicial duties are mainly to settle criminal cases and to resolve civil litigation as well as bankruptcy. The administration and registration tasks of the court include death registration, issuing certain certificates, performing duties of a notary public, and officiating civil wedding ceremonies. Cases from this court are heard by a combination of professional judges and lay judges.

History
This court was established on 26 April 2021 after the old Lofoten District Court and Salten District Court were merged into one court. The new district court system continues to use the courthouses from the predecessor courts.

References

District courts of Norway
2021 establishments in Norway
Organisations based in Bodø
Organisations based in Svolvær